Joseph Michael "Joe" Vargas (born October 4, 1955, in Los Angeles, California) is an American former water polo player who competed in the 1984 Summer Olympics. In 1992, he was inducted into the USA Water Polo Hall of Fame.

See also
 List of Olympic medalists in water polo (men)

References

External links
 

1955 births
Living people
American male water polo players
Water polo players at the 1984 Summer Olympics
Olympic silver medalists for the United States in water polo
Medalists at the 1984 Summer Olympics